Sarah Whipple Goodhue (3 November 1641–23 July 1681) was an American Puritan writer from New England who is remembered for her work The Copy of a Valedictory and Monitory Writing, written seven days before her death.

Biography 
Goodhue was born on 3 November 1641 in Ipswich, Massachusetts to a family of middle-class merchants. She was the only child of Elder John and Susannah Whipple. As a child, Sarah was exposed to the multifaceted activities of her father, which included politics, schooling, the general court, and his rule as elder of the church. Sarah Goodhue learnt to read and write, unlike many girls of that era.

She married Deacon Joseph Goodhue in Ipswich on 13 July 1661. They had their first child within ten months of being married, and they had nine children in total. In July 1681, a week before giving birth to twins, Goodhue had a strong feeling that she would die in childbirth and wrote a pre-emptive farewell to her family in the form of The Copy of a Valedictory and Monitory Writing. At the time, she already had three sons and four daughters. Goodhue died on 23 July 1681, three days after giving birth, along with one of the twins.

Writing 
Valedictory (1681) represents one of the few surviving triolets from this era of American literature. Goodhue explained the timeliness of her writing was due to a premonition she would die in childbirth: "I have had of late a strong persuasion upon my mind, that by sudden death I should be surprized." Valedictory is addressed to her husband, siblings, in-laws and children, with passages that are specifically addressed to different family members. She wrote of her religious devotion and her love for her husband and children. In an evangelical tone, she compelled her "Children, neighbours and friends" to "get a part and portion of Jesus Christ". She also expressed concern at leaving her husband to look after so many children alone, urging him to place some in the care of relatives.

Goodhue's writing suggests that she was a well-educated woman. Valedictory is crude at times but depicts the work of a well-practiced author, utilizing techniques such as couplets and 17-syllable lines. The poem depicts the depth of religious experience among Puritans. It is also an example of the limited evangelical role women could play at the time, which consisted of preaching within private circles. 

Valedictory was printed three times in 1770, 1805, and 1830. Women were not widely appreciated or recognized for their religious devotion during the 17th century, which is perhaps why the work was not published until the 18th century. In the 19th century, it was reported that the poem was owned by people in Ipswich and kept alongside their Bibles.

References

External links 

 The Copy of a Valedictory and Monitory Writing via Internet Archive

17th-century American writers
17th-century American women writers
1641 births
1681 deaths
Writers from Massachusetts